In addition to federal elections for President, Senate, and the House of Representatives, South Carolina held state elections on Tuesday, November 4, 2008.  Voters elected state senators, state representatives, solicitors and local officers, and voted in three statewide constitutional referendums.

South Carolina Senate

Republicans maintained their majority in the State Senate, keeping their majority of eight seats.

South Carolina House of Representatives

Republicans maintained their majority in the State House, decreasing their majority from 22 seats to 20 seats.

Constitutional referendums

Voters voted on Amendment 1, which amended Section 33 of Article III of the South Carolina constitution to delete a provision that set the age of consent for sexual activity for unmarried women at 14.  This amendment allowed the state legislature to set the age of consent by statute. The proposed amendment passed.

Amendment 2 would have changed section 16 of Article X of the state constitution to allow state trust funds for post-retirement benefits of public school teachers and state employees to be invested in equity securities.  The amendment failed.

Amendment 3 would have amended section 16 of the Article X of the state constitution to allow local employee benefit trust funds to be invested in equity securities.  The amendment failed.

References

External links
South Carolina State Election Commission
South Carolina State Races in 2008 campaign finance data for state races from Follow the Money
Ballotpedia pages on South Carolina State Senate elections and South Carolina State House elections

 
South Carolina